Q sort or Qsort may refer to:

Computing

 Quicksort
 qsort

Psychology

 Q methodology